"Kurdish melodies is a collection of Kurdish folk songs collected and transcribed by Armenian composer Komitas during field work among Kurds and published in December 1903. Despite collecting a large amount of Kurdish melodies, most of them were lost, and Kurdish melodies became the only publication of Kurdish songs by Komitas. Kurdish melodies would consequently become the first publication of Kurdish music.

Work

In his transcription, Komitas stayed loyal to the authentic structure of the songs and kept the unique Kurdish melodic structure. Most of the songs were epic songs. Komitas aspired to write down, preserve and make available the musical national heritage of the Kurdish people. For this, he sought to rest on authenticity. Moreover, he was keen on not collecting songs from the cities since he thought of them as corrupted and therefore spent most of his time in villages among locals. He began collecting Kurdish songs in the mid-1800s before returning to Echmiadzin in 1899.

The songs were collected around Mount Ararat.

Songs
The thirteen songs that comprises Kurdish melodies:
Ghandili Siapusch
Lelil Medjnum
Djanbalie
Hasan Agha
Mirza Agha
Khullekh Giaro I
Khullekh Giaro II
Mamzin
Darwischi Awdi
Sewahadje
Hamede Schange
Hame Musa
Sairan

See also
Aram Tigran
Armenian–Kurdish relations
Karapetê Xaço
Kurdish music

References

Further reading

1903 songs
Armenian songs
Folk songs
Kurdish music